Stanislav I Thurzo (c. 1470 in Kraków – 16 or 17 April 1540 in Olomouc) was a bishop of the Diocese of Olomouc. Although a Catholic, he was the son of János Thurzó, a protestant Hungarian nobleman of the Thurzó family who was mayor of Kraków, and his first wife, Ursula Boehm. He was educated at Padua in theology and law and was made canon in Olomouc.

He was a humanist and patron of the arts and science, but also undertook radical moral reforms in his diocese, and persecution of protestant groups.  He and his brother jointly crowned both Louis II of Hungary, and King of Bohemia Ferdinand I.

Stanislav died in the night 17 April 1540 and was buried in Saint Wenceslas Cathedral, Olomouc.

References

Bishops of Olomouc
15th-century Roman Catholic bishops in the Holy Roman Empire
Czech people of Hungarian descent
Thurzó family